Cristian Albeanu (born 5 October 1971) is a Romanian former footballer who played as a forward.

Conviction
On 25 September 1996 Albeanu was involved in a road accident while driving his car on the Bucharest - Ploiești road and hit one man who was regularly walking on the crosswalk. The man died and Albeanu received a two-year suspended sentence.

Honours
Național București
Cupa României runner-up: 1996–97 
Jiul Petroșani
Divizia C: 2002–03

Notes

References

1971 births
Living people
Romanian footballers
Romania under-21 international footballers
Association football forwards
Liga I players
Liga II players
FC Argeș Pitești players
FC Progresul București players
ACF Gloria Bistrița players
FC Bihor Oradea players
CSM Jiul Petroșani players
People from Târgu Cărbunești